William Clement Barker (1883–1937) was an English footballer who played in the Football League for Middlesbrough.

References

1883 births
1937 deaths
English footballers
Association football midfielders
English Football League players
South Bank F.C. players
Middlesbrough F.C. players